Daniel Shor (born November 16, 1956) is an American actor, director, writer, and acting teacher with a career spanning over 40 years. His most recognized roles include Enoch Emery in John Huston's Wise Blood (1979), Ram in Tron (1982), and Billy the Kid in Bill & Ted's Excellent Adventure (1989).

Early life 
Shor was born and raised in New York City. He attended McBurney School from the 6th through the 8th grade. His mother, an actress, died when he was 14. He graduated from Elisabeth Irwin High School (June 1974) and began at Northwestern University that fall. He returned to New York, where he landed the lead role of Alan Strang in the first national company of Equus.

Acting 
Shor's studies continued at the Davis Center for Performing Arts at the City College of New York and at the London Academy of Music and Dramatic Art in England.

While in London, he appeared with Nigel Planer in Ann Jellicoe's punk rock musical play The Sport Of My Mad Mad Mother at The Roundabout Theater. After leaving London for Los Angeles (due to his casting in the title role in the ABC mini-series Studs Lonigan), he produced and reprised his role in his own version of Jellicoe's play, changing the setting from London to New York. Three months later, the set from the production was used in Billy Idol's classic music video for the song "Dancing With Myself".

Shor's acting credits include Air Force One, Bill and Ted's Excellent Adventure, Tron, Red Rock West, and John Huston's Wise Blood. Television films and mini-series include Friendly Fire, Elvis and the Colonel: The Untold Story and The Blue and the Gray (for which Shor won a People's Choice Award). He was a series regular on Cagney and Lacey and several other television series as well as numerous guest star appearances including a Ferengi doctor on Star Trek: The Next Generation, a role he reprised seven years later on Star Trek: Voyager. In 1983, he starred in the band Kansas' music video "Fight Fire with Fire" and made appearances in their "Everybody's My Friend" video. Shor's stage performances in Los Angeles and San Diego have brought him eight Drama-Logue and LA Weekly performance awards.

Shor recently returned to the continental U.S. after living and working in the Northern Mariana Islands of the Western Pacific since 2003. In addition to running his production company, ShodaVision, he remains active in New York theater and was recently involved (as an actor) with the experimental conversational play "Outpost".

He has continued with stage work at the Guthrie Theater in Minneapolis and at the Pittsburgh Public Theater.

Writing, directing
In 1995, Shor directed for the LA Diversified Theater Company, a multi-cultural theater alliance. He directed the Ovation Award winning production of He Who Gets Slapped  starring Bud Cort at the Hudson Theater, as well as productions at the LA Theater Center, Company of Angels, Court, Zephyr, Two Roads and LA Jewish theaters. His productions have received more than 30 Dramalogue, Ovation and LA Weekly awards.

Shor's credits include two screenplays co-written with Czech film director Jiri Weiss. Shor has worked in videos and shows including "Life On Film: Rock", "Ecomaniacs", "State of Liberty", "Fish Out of Water" and over 30 short videos for the Saipan and Guam Visitors Channels. His recent work includes Bigfoot Entertainment and Fashion TV's reality show Screen Test. He has also taught acting at the International Academy of Film and Television in Cebu, Philippines.

Filmography

Acting

 1979 Friendly Fire (TV Movie) as Unknown
 1979 Wise Blood as Enoch Emory
 1980 If Things Were Different (TV Movie) as Eric
 1981 Back Roads as Spivey
 1981 Strange Behavior as Pete Brady
 1982 Tron as Roy Kleinberg / Ram
 1983 Strange Invaders as Teen Boy (Prologue)
 1983 Strangers Kiss as Farris, The Producer
 1983 This Girl for Hire (TV Movie) as Punk
 1984 Talk to Me as Julian Howard
 1984 My Mother's Secret Life (TV Movie) as Jack Camaras
 1984 Mike's Murder as Richard
 1986 Mesmerized as George
 1986 Black Moon Rising as Billy Lyons
 1988 Daddy's Boys as 'Hawk'
 1989 Bill & Ted's Excellent Adventure as Billy The Kid
 1990 Solar Crisis as Harvard
 1990 Ghoulies III: Ghoulies Go to College as Professor
 1993 Doppelganger as Stanley White
 1993 Red Rock West as Deputy Bowman
 1997 Air Force One as Notre Dame Aide
 1999 Night Train as Jones
 2004 Wild Roomies as Bartender
 2009 Passing Strangers (Short) as Photographer
 2011 Tron: The Next Day (Short) as Roy Kleinberg / Ram
 2017 Crown Heights as District Attorney Snyder

Directing
 2011 My Angel My Hero

Television

Directing
Journeys (2003)
State of Liberty (2007)

Acting
Once Upon a Classic episode, A Connecticut Yankee in King Arthur's Court (1978) - Clarence / Sir Paragraph
Studs Lonigan (1979) - Young Studs
A Rumor of War (1980) (Step One) (Knots Landing TV Series) (1980) - Manhole
The Boy Who Drank Too Much (1980, TV Movie) - Art Collins
The Blue and the Gray (1982) - Luke Geyser
Cagney & Lacey (1985-1986) - Det. Jonah Newman
Murder, She Wrote (1988) - Pierce
Beauty and the Beast (1989) - Bernie Spirko
thirtysomething (1989) - Kit
Star Trek: The Next Generation (1989) - Dr. Arridor
Elvis and the Colonel: The Untold Story (1993, TV Movie) - Jass
Star Trek: Voyager (1996) - Arridor
Judging Amy (2000) - D.A. Daniel Boyd
The X Files (2002) - 2nd ER Nurse

References

External links 
 
 
 June 2003 Tron-Sector Q&A with Dan Shor (RAM)
 ShodaVision Official Site
 Article concerning Shor's production company in Saipan 
 "Principal photography wraps up on State" 
 Times Square Article: "Dan Shor is Cool as Hell"

1956 births
Living people
Male actors from New York City
American male film actors
American male television actors
Northern Mariana Islands culture
Alumni of the London Academy of Music and Dramatic Art
McBurney School alumni
Little Red School House alumni